The Handbook for Boys may be:

Boy Scout Handbook
The American Boy's Handy Book